Wansford railway station is the headquarters of the Nene Valley Railway in Cambridgeshire, England. The station building was opened in 1995 and contains a ticket office, shop, cafe and toilets. The locomotive sheds are located at this station. Also at the station there is a picnic area and children's playground. The station was formerly the junction for a branch to Stamford, which separated to the north just east of the river bridge at Wansford.

Wansford station and the line immediately either side of it, including the level crossing and the river bridge appeared several times in the James Bond film Octopussy.

History
The station opened with the Northampton and Peterborough Railway from Blisworth to Peterborough in 1845. Being located on the Great North Road, it was for a few years the railhead for Grantham, Lincoln, etc., which at this time were not served by any railway lines. The branch line to Stamford opened in 1867. At the same time, the Great Northern began a service from Peterborough North to Leicester Belgrave Road via Wansford, Seaton and the newly opened Great Northern and London and North Western Joint Railway in east Leicestershire.
The Leicester trains were stopped as a war economy in 1916. The Stamford branch closed in 1929, having never properly recovered from the 1926 general strike.  The station closed for regular passenger services on 1 July 1957 but passenger services from Peterborough continued to use the line to Northampton until 1964, and to Rugby until 1966. The Rugby line remained open for freight as far as the sand and gravel quarries at Nassington. When these stopped, the line closed but the track remained in situ. The line became the Nene Valley Railway heritage railway and was reopened on 1 June 1977.

Station features

Barnwell station building
The waiting room on platform two is referred to as "The Barnwell Building" due to it having been moved from Barnwell station to Wansford on 5 April 1977. The building is of typical LNWR wooden construction.  It was originally built in 1884 for use by members of the Royal family when visiting Barnwell Manor, home of the Duke of Gloucester.

Old Wansford station building
The original Wansford station, designed by John William Livock, is located on platform three and was built in 1844–1845 in Jacobean style for the opening of the railway. This building was finally purchased by the Nene Valley Railway in 2015. In October 2011 it appeared on the list of the ten most threatened Victorian and Edwardian buildings, published by the Victorian Society.

Wansford signal box
The signal box was built in 1907 by the London and North Western Railway to replace three smaller boxes. It was originally built with 60 levers and is one of the largest preserved signal boxes in its original location.

Turntable
The turntable is located behind the new station building, and was built by Ransomes & Rapier of Ipswich in 1933. It continued in use there until 1959 when Bourne shed closed and the turntable was moved to Peterborough East; its last duties being to turn Travelling Post Office (TPO) coaches for use on the East Anglian TPO.

The turntable has been in use ever since to turn the locomotives and carriages at the NVR.

Model railway
On platform 4 there is a model railway which has been put together by enthusiasts over five years, housed in a converted rail coach. This coach is a BR Mk2e FO ex 'London's Burning' coach, number W3227. The main layout, called Hammerton Junction, is mainly 00 gauge; one end is raised up and has N gauge on it. There is a small layout called Iron Sidings built on top of an ironing board.

Summary of Services

Sample Train Timetable for April 1910
The table below shows the train departures from Wansford on weekdays in April 1910.

Use in film and television

The old station building appeared in the 1983 James Bond film Octopussy, in which Bond (played by Roger Moore) drove a Mercedes-Benz car along the railway tracks after its tyres were punctured in pursuit of a train on which the villainous Kamal Khan (Louis Jourdan) was transporting a bomb. This scene was scripted as being in East Germany.

A station identified by a sign as Wansford appears in the music video for the 1991 single 'The Air that You Breathe' by UK band, Bomb the Bass.

References

External links

Nene Valley Railway
Heritage railway stations in Cambridgeshire
Transport in Peterborough
Buildings and structures in Peterborough
Former London and North Western Railway stations
Railway stations in Great Britain opened in 1845
Railway stations in Great Britain closed in 1957
Railway stations in Great Britain opened in 1977
John William Livock buildings